Medical Missions for Children is an independent, non-profit organization that works to improve health outcomes for our world's most critically ill children by providing individual telemedicine consultations and implementing education programs focused on narrowing the knowledge gap between healthcare providers in the United States and those in the developing world.  MMC focuses on "transferring medical knowledge from those who have it to those who need it" using a state-of-the-art communications infrastructure in order to touch the lives of more than one million critically ill children each year.

About
Medical Missions for Children was founded in 1999 by Frank and Peg Brady.  Its Global Telemedicine and Teaching Network (GTTN) currently serves over 100 countries throughout Latin America/Caribbean, Africa, North America, Asia/Pacific, Eastern Europe/Central Asia and the Middle East.

MMC is located on the campus of St. Joseph's Regional Medical Center in Paterson, New Jersey. It is a major stakeholder in The Hamiltonian, a 14-story hotel and conference center projected to open in 2016.

The Global Telemedicine and Teaching Network
The Global Telemedicine and Teaching Network (GTTN) comprises several programs:
The Medical Broadcasting Channel - A 24/7/365 channel airing medical programming via satellite broadcast, Internet2, and IPTV Networks.
The Telemedicine Outreach Program -  a network of 27 tier-one mentoring hospitals in the United States and Europe linking to hospitals and institutions in more than 100 countries.

This Medical Missions for Children/Paterson, NJ (MMC) should not be confused with Medical Missions for Children (MMFC), a 501(3)(c) charity based in Woburn, Massachusetts, that sends 13-15 surgical, medical and dental missions around the world each year to care for impoverished children who suffer from cleft deformities, microtia (absence of ear), head and neck abnormalities and severe, untreated burn injuries

Television programs
MMC currently produces four healthcare series, several of which have been broadcast on the New Jersey Network, the predecessor to NJTV, New Jersey's affiliate of PBS.
Tomorrow's Medicine Today
Plain Talk About Health
Take Care
Healthy U

The Giggles Children's Theater
Located at St. Joseph's Children's Hospital, the Giggles Children's Theater (Giggles) draws its curtains twice each week to bring the healing powers of laughter through the performing arts to hospitalized children in Paterson.  Each performance is broadcast live on the hospital's closed-circuit TV system so that no child is excluded due to sickness or incapacity. Each performance is also recorded and rebroadcast so that 10 shows per week are offered on the hospital's Giggles TV channel.

In April 2007 a second Giggles theater opened at The Children's Inn located at the campus of the National Institutes of Health.

Awards and honors
Co-Founder, Frank Brady, named 2008 World of Children Health Award Honoree
Four-Star Rating from Charity Navigator (2005, 2006, 2007)
Computer World 21st Century Achievement Award (2007)
World Bank Global Development Finalist (2007)
Stockholm Challenge (2006)
Purpose Prize Fellow  (2006)
Tech Museum Laureate (2006)
IESC Award (2006)
Contact Center World Award (2006)
Intelligent Community Award (2006)
Johnson & Johnson Best Health & Arts Award for Giggle's Children's Theater (2005)
CHEST Foundation's 2005 Humanitarian Recognition Award presented to Dr. Roberto Nachajon of St. Joseph's Children's Hospital for his contributions to Medical Missions for Children (2005)
Executive Director, Peg Brady named Female Entrepreneur of the Year by Fairleigh Dickinson University's Rothman Institute (2005)
Healthcare Informatics Award (2004)
Certificate of Special Congressional Recognition (2003)
Federal 100 Award (2003)
Lifetime Achievement Award National Hispanic Medical Association (2001)

See also 
 Medical missions

References

External links
Medical Missions for Children's official website 

Health charities in the United States
Charities based in New Jersey
Companies based in Passaic County, New Jersey
Paterson, New Jersey
Medical and health organizations based in New Jersey